Gusan may refer to:

Gusan (Accursed Mountains), a mountain located in Albania and Kosovo
Gusans, performing artists in the Parthian Empire and medieval Greater Armenia
Nema language or Gusan, Papua New Guinea 
Nine mountain schools or Gusan, monasteries of the Korean branch of Buddhism

See also
Gusan-dong, a neighbourhood of Seoul, South Korea